Ákos Elek (born 21 July 1988) is a Hungarian professional footballer who plays as a defensive midfielder for MOL Vidi FC in the Nemzeti Bajnokság I.

Club career

Kazincbarcika
Elek started his career in the Kazincbarcikai SC in 2005. The team played in the Hungarian Second Division. He scored his only goal against Makó FC.

Videoton FC
In 2008 Elek signed a contract with the Videoton FC. He played his first match against Siófok on 26 July 2006. In 2010-11 Nemzeti Bajnokság I Elek won the Hungarian League with his club.

Diósgyőr
On 25 July 2012, Elek was signed by Hungarian League club Diósgyőr.

Changchun Yatai
On 18 January 2015, Elek signed a two-year contract with Changchun Yatai F.C.

Diósgyőr - 2nd spell

Kairat
On 8 March 2017, Kairat announced the singing of Elek on a two-year contract, with the option of an additional third year.

MOL Vidi
On 8 January 2019, Elek returned to MOL Vidi FC.

International career

Being a permanent member of his club in Videoton Elek was invited to join the Hungary national team by Hungarian coach Sándor Egervári. Elek scored his first international goal against Iceland at the Puskás Ferenc Stadium. The match finished 4–0.

Elek was selected for Hungary's Euro 2016 squad.

He played in the last group match in a 3–3 draw against Portugal at the Parc Olympique Lyonnais, Lyon on 22 June 2016.

Career statistics

Club

International

Scores and results list Hungary's goal tally first, score column indicates score after each Elek goal.

Honours

Videoton
 Nemzeti Bajnokság I: 2010–11
 Hungarian Cup: 2018-19

Diósgyőr
Hungarian League Cup: 2013–14

Individual
 Nemzeti Sport Team of the Season: 2009–10, 2010–11 Autumn Season, 2010–11, 2014–15 Autumn Season

References

External links

 
 
 
 Profile
 Elek Ákos profile at magyarfutball.hu

1988 births
Living people
People from Ózd
Hungarian footballers
Association football midfielders
Hungary under-21 international footballers
Hungary international footballers
Kazincbarcikai SC footballers
Fehérvár FC players
Eskişehirspor footballers
Diósgyőri VTK players
Süper Lig players
Nemzeti Bajnokság I players
Hungarian expatriate footballers
Expatriate footballers in Turkey
Hungarian expatriate sportspeople in Turkey
Expatriate footballers in China
Changchun Yatai F.C. players
Chinese Super League players
UEFA Euro 2016 players
FC Kairat players
Kazakhstan Premier League players
Expatriate footballers in Kazakhstan
Sportspeople from Borsod-Abaúj-Zemplén County